The 1993 Utah State Aggies football team represented Utah State University in the 1993 NCAA Division I-A football season. The Aggies were led by second-year head coach Charlie Weatherbie and played their home games at Romney Stadium in Logan, Utah. After a 1–5 start to the season, the team rebounded to finish the regular season 6–5 and earn a spot in the Las Vegas Bowl against Ball State, where they achieved their first bowl win in school history. The team's roster included redshirt freshman quarterback Matt Wells, who was later hired as an assistant coach at the school in 2011 before being promoted to head coach for the 2013 season.

Schedule

References

Utah State
Utah State Aggies football seasons
Big West Conference football champion seasons
Las Vegas Bowl champion seasons
Utah State Aggies football